Anomaloglossus praderioi is a species of frog in the family Aromobatidae. It is found in the Pantepui region of southeastern Venezuela and western Guyana. More specifically, this frog is known from Mount Roraima (its type locality; Venezuela/Guyana), Sierra de Lema in Venezuela, and Maringma-tepui in Guyana. Its actual range is probably wider and might reach into northern Brazil.

Description
Anomaloglossus praderioi are relatively small frogs, though medium-sized among Anomaloglossus: males measure  in snout–vent length and a single female . It has a robust body with shagreened to finely granular (more granular posteriorly) skin in the dorsum.

The male advertisement call consists of long trains of a single note repeated at a rate of 61–76 notes/min.

Habitat and conservation
Anomaloglossus praderioi occurs in montane medium-canopy forest at elevations between  asl. Specimens have been found on rocks covered by mosses and on moist soils, in areas with very low light intensity and abundant decaying vegetation.

Anomaloglossus praderioi was assessed as "data deficient" in 2004, when it was only known from its type locality. In view that it is now known to have a wider distribution, it could now be classified as "Endangered". It occurs in the Canaima National Park in Venezuela and the Kaieteur National Park in Guyana.

References

praderioi
Frogs of South America
Amphibians of Guyana
Amphibians of Venezuela
Amphibians described in 1997
Taxa named by Enrique La Marca
Taxonomy articles created by Polbot
Amphibians of the Tepuis